Regina Exhibition Stadium, also known as Regina Stadium and Queen City Gardens, was an indoor arena at Evraz Place in Regina, Saskatchewan.

Constructed in 1919, the venue was home arena of the Regina Pats of the Western Hockey League before the construction of the Agridome in 1977. The venue was notable for its use in agricultural exhibitions, sporting events, as well as concerts, having hosted acts such as The Beach Boys, Buddy Holly, Chuck Barry's Biggest Show of Stars tour, and Johnny Cash among others.

Jack Hamilton served as president of the Regina Rink Company which raised funds to install an artificial ice maker in the Regina Stadium. He operated the rink for 11 years from 1938 to 1949, when it was known as the Queen City Gardens.

In 2015, the arena was used as a filming location for Chokeslam, a professional wrestling-themed romantic comedy film. By 2017, the arena had been described as "deteriorating", and contrasting to other new developments at the grounds such as Mosaic Stadium. In 2017, Regina Exhibition Stadium was demolished in order to construct the International Trade Centre, a new $37 million, 150,000 square-foot convention space that would link all of Evraz Place's indoor facilities.

References

Buildings and structures in Regina, Saskatchewan
Defunct indoor arenas in Canada
Indoor ice hockey venues in Canada
Regina Pats
Sports venues in Saskatchewan
Western Hockey League arenas
Demolished buildings and structures in Canada
Defunct indoor ice hockey venues in Canada
Boxing venues in Canada
Sports venues completed in 1919
Sports venues demolished in 2017
1919 establishments in Saskatchewan
2017 disestablishments in Saskatchewan
Demolished sports venues